José Quiñaliza (born July 21, 1961) is a male track and field athlete from Ecuador, who competed in the triple jump event during his career.

International competitions

References

sports-reference

1961 births
Living people
Ecuadorian male triple jumpers
Olympic athletes of Ecuador
Athletes (track and field) at the 1987 Pan American Games
Athletes (track and field) at the 1988 Summer Olympics
World Athletics Championships athletes for Ecuador
South American Games gold medalists for Ecuador
South American Games medalists in athletics
Competitors at the 1986 South American Games
Pan American Games competitors for Ecuador